Abraham Kaplan (June 11, 1918 – June 19, 1993) was an American philosopher, known best for being the first philosopher to systematically examine the behavioral sciences in his book The Conduct of Inquiry (1964). His thinking was influenced by pragmatists Charles Sanders Peirce, William James, and John Dewey.

Biography
Kaplan's parents were Joseph J. and Chava (Lerner) Kaplan.  Abraham's father was a rabbi.  He was raised in Odessa, Ukraine. He became a naturalized citizen of the United States in 1930, after immigrating to the country in 1923.  In 1937, he graduated in chemistry from the College of St. Thomas.  He received a Ph.D. in philosophy 1942 from the University of California, Los Angeles.  He was assistant professor at New York University from 1940-1945.  He then returned to the UCLA Department of Philosophy as assistant professor for the next four years of his life, and associate professor for three years after that.  Kaplan became a professor of philosophy in 1952, and stayed there for twelve years.  He was also chair of the department for those twelve years, along with two years past that.

He taught at the University of Michigan from 1962 to 1972 as well.  Then in 1978 he moved to teaching at University of Haifa in Israel, where he also served as dean of the faculty of social sciences.  From 1977 to 1984 he was a faculty member of the RAND Graduate School in Santa Monica, California.  Kaplan also taught at Harvard University, California Institute of Technology, California State Polytechnic University, Pomona, the University of Hawai'i at Manoa and several other schools. While at Harvard, he taught Stanley Cavell. He was also president of the American Philosophical Association from 1947 to 1958.

His co-authored book with Harold Lasswell Power and Society: a framework for political inquiry was published in 1950. His The conduct of inquiry: methodology for behavioral science was published in 1964.

Kaplan was named one of the top ten teachers in the United States in 1966 by Time magazine.  He also traveled to India, Israel, and Japan to study their cultures and beliefs.

On November 17, 1939, Abraham Kaplan married Iona Judith Wax, a child psychologist. They had two children: Karen Eva Kaplan Diskin and Jessica Aryia Kaplan Symonds.

Bibliography
Power and Society: A Framework for Political Inquiry, 1951
The new world of philosophy, 1961
American ethics and public policy, 1963
The conduct of inquiry: methodology for behavioral science, 1964
Individuality and the New Society, 1970
In pursuit of wisdom: the scope of philosophy, 1977

See also
American philosophy
List of American philosophers

Notes

References 
New York Times, Obituary
Cal Poly Pomona University Library, Biography on Abraham Kaplan
The conduct of inquiry at google books
1968 documentary

External links

 Abraham Kaplan, The Process of Observation (1964)

20th-century American philosophers
Pragmatists
Odesa Jews
Soviet emigrants to the United States
University of California, Los Angeles alumni
Jewish philosophers
New York University faculty
University of California, Los Angeles faculty
University of Michigan faculty
Academic staff of the University of Haifa
Harvard University faculty
1918 births
1993 deaths
UCLA Philosophy